The 2011 Abuja police headquarters bombing was believed to be the first suicide bombing in Nigeria's history. The attack occurred on 16 June 2011, when a suicide bomber drove a car bomb onto the premises of the Louis Edet House in Abuja, the headquarters of the Nigeria Police Force. He may have been trying to kill Inspector-General of Police Hafiz Ringim, whose convoy he followed into the compound, but he was stopped by security before he could do so.

It was confirmed that the bomber and a traffic policeman were killed, although authorities said there may have been up to six casualties.

The Sunni Islamist group Boko Haram claimed the explosion.

See also
2011 Abuja United Nations bombing

References

2011 murders in Nigeria
Explosions in 2011
21st century in Abuja
Boko Haram bombings
Mass murder in 2011
Suicide car and truck bombings in Nigeria
Terrorist incidents in Nigeria in 2011
Murder in Abuja
Attacks on police stations in the 2010s
June 2011 events in Africa
Terrorist incidents in Abuja
Attacks on buildings and structures in Nigeria
Building bombings in Africa
Attacks in Nigeria in 2011